Wayne Trottier  is an American politician in the state of North Dakota. He is a member of the North Dakota House of Representatives, representing the 19th district. He served on the Northwood City Council from 2004 to 2008 before his election to the legislature in 2010.

Background
Trottier served for two years in the U.S. Army and worked as a sales manager for a feed company and as an auctioneer. He also served on the North Dakota State Fair Board for 16 years prior to his election to the legislature.

Personal life
Trottier is an enrolled member of the Standing Rock Sioux Tribe, and his father was Turtle Mountain Chippewa. He is married with one son.

References

Republican Party members of the North Dakota House of Representatives
American people of Ojibwe descent
Native American state legislators
Ojibwe people
Politicians from Grand Forks, North Dakota
Living people
21st-century American politicians
Year of birth missing (living people)
Standing Rock Sioux people